India is home to a large variety of wildlife. It is a biodiversity hotspot with its various ecosystems ranging from the Himalayas in the north to the evergreen rain forests in the south, the  sands of the west to the marshy mangroves of the east. India lies within the Indomalayan realm and is the home to about 7.6% of mammal, 14.7% of amphibian, 6% of bird, 6.2% of reptilian, and 6.2% of flowering plant species. India's forest lands nurture about 500 species of mammals and more than 2000 bird species.

India is one of the most biodiverse regions of the world and contains three of the world’s 36 biodiversity hotspots – the Western Ghats, the Eastern Himalayas, and the Indo-Burma hotspot. It is one of the seventeen megadiverse countries. The country has twelve Biosphere Reserves in the World Network of Biosphere Reserves and seventy five Ramsar sites.

In response to decrease in the numbers of wild animals, human encroachment and poaching activities, the government of India established a system of national parks and protected areas in 1935, which was subsequently expanded. In 1972, India enacted the Wildlife Protection Act of 1972 and Project Tiger to safeguard crucial habitat. Further, federal protections were promulgated in the 1980s.

India has about 2,714 endemic lichen species. In 2020, the Lichen Park in India was developed by the Uttarakhand Forest Department in Munsiyari.

Geographic origins 
Many Indian species are descendants of species originating in Gondwana, of which India originally was a part. Peninsular India's subsequent movement towards, and collision with, the Laurasian landmass set off a mass exchange of species. However, volcanism and climatic change 20 million years ago caused the extinction of many endemic Indian forms. Soon thereafter, mammals entered India from Asia through two zoogeographical passes on either side of the emerging Himalaya. As a result, among Indian species, only 12.6% of mammals and 4.5% of birds are endemic, contrasting with 45.8% of reptiles and 55.8% of amphibians Notable endemics are the Nilgiri langur and the brown and carmine Beddome's toad of the Western Ghats. India harbours 172, or 2.9%, of IUCN-designated threatened species.
India is located at the junction of three realms namely Afrotropical, Indomalayan and Paleoarctic, and therefore, has characteristic elements from each of them, spurring migration of avifauna from these regions.

Fauna 

 

India is home to several well-known large animals, including the Indian elephant, Indian rhinoceros, Bengal tiger, Asiatic lion, Indian leopard, snow leopard, and clouded leopard. Bears include sloth bear, sun bear, the Himalayan black bear, the Himalayan brown bear, and deer and antelopes include the chausinga antelope, the blackbuck, chinkara gazelle, chital, sambar (deer), sangai, nilgai, Tibetan antelope, goa (antelope), Kashmir stag, musk deer, Indian muntjac, Indian hog deer, and the barasinga. It is home to big cats like Bengal tiger, Asiatic lion, Indian leopard, snow leopard, caracal, Eurasian lynx and clouded leopard. Various species of caprines, including Bhutan and Mishmi takin, Himalayan and red goral, Himalayan serow, red serow, Himalayan tahr, Siberian ibex, markhor, and Nilgiri tahr, as well as the kiang and Indian wild ass can be found. Wild sheep include blue sheep and argali. Gaur, wild water buffalo, wild yak, zebu, and gayal are also found. Small mammals include Indian crested porcupine, Indian boar, pygmy hog, Nilgiri marten, palm civet, red panda, binturong, and hog badger. Canidae include Tibetan and Bengal fox, Himalayan and Indian wolf, Ussuri Dhole and Indian Jackal. It is also home to the Striped Hyena. Aquatic mammals include Ganges river dolphin and finless porpoise. Reptiles include king cobra, Indian cobra, bamboo pit viper, Sri Lankan green vine snake, common krait, Indian rock python, Burmese python, reticulated python, mugger crocodile, gharial, saltwater crocodile and Indian golden gecko. Notable amphibians include the purple frog, Indian tree frog and Himalayan newt. Birds include Indian peacock, great Indian hornbill, great Indian bustard, ruddy shelduck, Himalayan monal, Himalayan quail, painted stork, greater and lesser flamingo, and Eurasian spoonbill.

Flora 

There are about 18500 taxa of flowering plants from India. The Indian Forest Act, 1927 helped to improve the protection and security of the natural habitat. Many ecoregions, such as the shola forests, also exhibit extremely high rates of endemism; overall, 33% of Indian plant species are endemic. Flora and Vegetation of forest cover ranges from the tropical rainforest of the Andaman Islands, Western Ghats, and Northeast India to the coniferous forest of the Himalaya. Between these extremes lie the sal-dominated moist deciduous forest of eastern India; teak-dominated dry deciduous forest of central and southern India, and the babul-dominated thorn forest of the central Deccan and western Gangetic plain. Mangrove forests such as the Sundarbans are on the coasts of states like West Bengal and Odisha. Important Indian trees include the medicinal neem, widely used in rural Indian herbal remedies. Bamboo gardens are extremely common in jungles as well as villages. States like Sikkim and West Bengal have orchids. The national flower of India, the lotus flower, is common in lakes and ponds.

Fungi
One-third of the fungal diversity of the globe exists in India. Only a fraction of the fungi of India have been subjected to scientific scrutiny. The country has at least 10 diverse biomes including the Trans-Himalayan zone, the Himalayas, the Western Ghats, the Deccan Peninsula, the Gangetic Plain, North-Eastern India, desert zones, semi-arid zones, coasts and islands. Thermophiles, psychrophiles, mesophiles, fresh-water, marine, plant and animal pathogens and edible fungi have been described. Over 27,000 species have been recorded in India, making it the largest biotic community after insects. The kingdom Fungi has four phyla, 103 orders, 484 families and 4979 genera. About 205 genera have been described from India, of which 32% were discovered by C. V. Subramanian of the University of Madras.

Conservation

Article 48 of the Constitution of India says, "The state shall endeavour to protect and improve the environment and to safeguard the forests and wildlife of the country" and Article 51-A states that "it shall be the duty of every citizen of India to protect and improve the natural environment including forests, lakes, rivers, and wildlife and to have compassion for living creatures."  The committee in the Indian Board for Wildlife, in their report, defines wildlife as "the entire natural uncultivated flora and fauna of the country" while the Wildlife Protection Act, 1972 defines it as "any animal, bees, butterflies, crustacea, fish, moths and aquatic or land vegetation which forms part of any habitat."

Despite the various environmental issues faced, the country still has rich and varied wildlife.

As of 2020-21, there are 981 protected areas including 106 National Parks, 566 Wildlife Sanctuaries, 97 Conservation Reserves and 214 Community Reserves. In addition there are 51 Tiger Reserves, 18 Biosphere Reserves and 32 Elephant Reserves.
Hundreds of India's bird populations are in serious decline, according to a study spanning over 25 years.
In 2020 the Indian government created the world's first sea cucumber reserve in Lakshadweep-Dr KK Mohammed Koya Sea Cucumber Conservation Reserve, the largest marine conservation reserve - Attakoya Thangal Marine Conservation Reserve and the first protected area for marine birds in India - PM Sayeed Marine Birds Conservation Reserve.

Gir forest in India has the only surviving population of Asiatic lions in the world. In the late 1960s, there were only about 180 Asiatic lions. There were 523 Asiatic lions in the Gir National Park in Gujarat state which in 2018 increased to more than 600.

Extinctions in recent times 
Some bird species have gone extinct in recent times, including the pink-headed duck (Rhodonessa caryophyllacea) and the Himalayan quail (Ophrysia superciliosa). A species of warbler, Acrocephalus orinus, known earlier from a single specimen collected by Allan Octavian Hume from near Rampur in Himachal Pradesh, was rediscovered after 139 years in Thailand.

Asiatic cheetah became extinct in India in the 1950. India's last recorded cheetah in the wild was said to have been shot in the Rewa area of Madhya Pradesh in the late 1940s.

Cultural influence 

The varied and rich wildlife of India has had a profound impact on the region's popular culture. India's wildlife has been the subject of numerous tales and fables such as the Panchatantra or the Jataka Tales.
Notions of the wildlife of India were introduced in the west and also been made famous through The Jungle Book in late 1800s by Rudyard Kipling.

National animals

 National animal: Tiger
National heritage animal of India: Indian Elephant
National aquatic animal: South Asian river dolphin
National Bird: Indian peacock
National Reptile of India: King Cobra

Biosphere reserves 
The Indian government has established 18 biosphere reserves, which protect larger areas of natural habitat and often include one or more national parks or reserves, along buffer zones that are open to some economic uses. Protection is granted not only to the flora and fauna of the protected region, but also to the human communities who inhabit these regions, and their ways of life.

The protected areas are:
 Achanakmar Wildlife Sanctuary
 Agasthyamala Biosphere Reserve
 Dibru-Saikhowa National Park
 Dihang-Dibang Biosphere Reserve
 Great Nicobar Biosphere Reserve
 Gulf of Mannar Marine National Park
 Kutch Desert Wildlife Sanctuary
 Khangchendzonga National Park
 Manas National Park
 Nanda Devi National Park
 Nilgiri Mountains
 Nokrek National Park
 Pachmarhi Biosphere Reserve
 Simlipal National Park
 Sundarbans National Park
 Cold Desert
 Seshachalam Hills
 Panna National Park

Eleven of the eighteen biosphere reserves are a part of the World Network of Biosphere Reserves, based on the UNESCO Man and the Biosphere Programme (MAB) list.
 Gulf of Mannar Biosphere Reserve
 Nanda Devi Biosphere Reserve
 Nilgiri Biosphere Reserve
 Nokrek National Park
 Pachmarhi Biosphere Reserve
 Simlipal National Park
 Sundarbans Biosphere Reserve
 Achanakmar-Amarkantak Biosphere Reserve
 Nicobar Islands
 Agasthyamala Biosphere Reserve
 Khangchendzonga

See also
 Birding in Chennai
 Birdwatchers' Field Club of Bangalore
 Endemic birds of the Andaman and Nicobar Islands
 India Nature Watch
 Indian Council of Forestry Research and Education
 List of birds of India
 List of mammals of India
 List of reptiles of South Asia
 Van Vigyan Kendra
 Wildlife Population of India

References

Further reading
 Saravanan, Velayutham. Environmental History of Modern India: Land, Population, Technology and Development (Bloomsbury Publishing India, 2022) online review

External links
 Official website of: Government of India, Ministry of Environment & Forests
 "Legislations on Environment, Forests, and Wildlife" from the Official website of: Government of India, Ministry of Environment & Forests
 "India's Forest Conservation Legislation: Acts, Rules, Guidelines", from the official website of the Government of India, Ministry of Environment & Forests
 Wildlife Legislations, including - "The Indian Wildlife (Protection) Act" from the Official website of: Government of India, Ministry of Environment & Forests

 
India
Biota of India